Frank Lawrence House is a historic home located at Basham, Montgomery County, Virginia.  It was built in 1918, and is a two-story frame dwelling with a foursquare floor plan. The roof is covered with its original pressed metal shingles. It features a five-bay, wraparound porch with Doric order columns and square balusters. It also has a two-story, two level rear porch.  Its design is based on a Sears and Roebuck Company catalog plan.

It was listed on the National Register of Historic Places in 1989.

References

Houses on the National Register of Historic Places in Virginia
Houses completed in 1918
Houses in Montgomery County, Virginia
National Register of Historic Places in Montgomery County, Virginia